The Department of Home Affairs and Environment was an Australian government department that existed between November 1980 and December 1984.

Scope
Information about the department's functions and/or government funding allocation could be found in the Administrative Arrangements Orders, the annual Portfolio Budget Statements and in the Department's annual reports.

According to the National Archives of Australia, at its creation, the Department was responsible for:
Constitutional development of the Northern Territory of Australia 
Administration of Norfolk Island, the Territory of Cocos (Keeling) Islands, the Territory of Christmas Island, the Coral Sea Islands Territory and the Territory of Ashmore and Cartier Islands
Women's affairs
Support of the arts and letters
National archives
National museums
World expositions
Leisure, including sport, physical fitness and community recreation
Environment and conservation.

Structure
The Department was an Australian Public Service department, staffed by officials who were responsible to the Minister for Home Affairs and Environment.

The Department was headed by a Secretary, initially D.F. McMichael (until 1 February 1984) and then P. Galvin (acting in the role from 1 February 1984, then permanent from 27 July 1984).

References

Home Affairs and Environment
Australia